Nicolás López Araújo (born 17 May 1986 in Montevideo) is a Uruguayan footballer currently playing the position of forward for Huracán Football Club in  the Uruguayan Segunda División.

External links
 
 

1986 births
Living people
Uruguayan footballers
Association football forwards
Uruguayan expatriate footballers
Racing Club de Montevideo players
Manta F.C. footballers
El Tanque Sisley players
Expatriate footballers in Ecuador